Darius Myron Washington Jr. (born December 6, 1985) is an American-Macedonian professional basketball player who last played for Phoenix Brussels. 

He is a combo guard and played college basketball with the University of Memphis. He has also played with the NBA's San Antonio Spurs and the NBA D-League's Austin Toros in 2007.

Amateur career
An AAU national champion at age 10, Washington attended Edgewater High School in Orlando, Florida. In his senior year, he played in an ESPN High School Showcase game against future NBA player Sebastian Telfair.

He went to University of Memphis, where he earned Conference USA Rookie of the Year and freshman All-American honors on averages of 15.4 points per game and a team-best 3.8 assists. With no time remaining in the championship game of the 2005 Conference-USA tournament, Washington was given three free throws to overcome a 75-73 lead by the sixth-ranked Louisville Cardinals. Although Washington was a 72-percent shooter, he missed two of the three foul shots, giving Louisville the win and an appearance in the NCAA tournament while Washington and the Tigers' season would continue in the NIT, where they would reach the semifinal round.  

In his sophomore season at Memphis, Washington helped lead the #1-seeded Tigers to an Elite Eight appearance in the 2006 NCAA tournament, losing to eventual runner-up UCLA. He was named to the All-Conference USA first team and earned an honorable mention as an All-American by the Associated Press.

Professional career
On April 25, 2006, Washington declared himself as an early entry candidate for the 2006 NBA draft. Confident he would be drafted, he signed with a sports agent on June 26, two days before the draft, losing his eligibility to play in college. With analysts being skeptical on his reliability to play point guard, he was not drafted. Although analyst Dick Vitale and others believed Washington had a shot to make an NBA roster as a free agent, he failed to do so after trying out with several teams during training camp.

Europe
He was later drafted by the Austin Toros of the D-League, but he instead chose to sign with PAOK Thessaloniki of the Greek League. In 2007, he led the ČEZ Nymburk team to the Czech Republic League title after leaving PAOK. He played in the ULEB Cup competition during the year with both clubs.

In January 2008, Washington signed a 2-year contract with the Euroleague club Aris Thessaloniki, a team that competes in the Greek League. He was released by Aris after one season. At the end of October 2008, he signed a contract with the Russian Super League club Ural Great Perm.

In July 2009, he signed a contract with Galatasaray Cafe Crown.

In April 2010, he signed with Lottomatica Roma until the end of the season.

In 2011, he joined the Piratas de Quebradillas.

In the summer of 2011, he signed a contract with Türk Telekom.

In January 2013, he joined Israeli side Hapoel Eilat, but only played 6 games with the team, averaging 11ppg and 1.3apg. Though highly praised in Eilat, his contract was bought out and in February, he moved to French side Le Mans. In July 2013, he joined Olin Edirne Basket in Turkey.

On June 23, 2014, he signed with his former team ČEZ Nymburk for the 2014–15 season.

On January 16, 2018, he returned to Greece and joined Iraklis Thessaloniki of the Greek A2 Basket League.

On April 5, 2019, he signed with Macedonian basketball club Rabotnički.

On May 4, 2020, he signed with Phoenix Brussels.

The Basketball Tournament (TBT)
In the summer of 2018, Washington competed in The Basketball Tournament on ESPN for Team DRC. In three games, he averaged 15.0 points, 4.0 rebounds, 2.0 assists and 2.0 steals per game. His team was eliminated in Super 16 Round by Ram Nation.

In the summer of 2019, he also competed in The Basketball Tournament on ESPN. In two games for Bluff City, he averages 12.5 points, 3.5 rebounds, 1.0 assists and 1 steals per game. His team was eliminated in Round 2 of Memphis Regional Tournament by Louisiana United.

Career statistics

NBA

Regular season

|-
| style="text-align:left;" | 
| style="text-align:left;" | San Antonio
| 18 || 0 || 8.1 || .438 || .333 || .538 || 1.1 || .8 || .3 || .0 || 2.9
|- class="sortbottom"
| style="text-align:center;" colspan="2"| Career
| 18 || 0 || 8.1 || .438 || .333 || .538 || 1.1 || .8 || .3 || .0 || 2.9

EuroLeague

|-
| style="text-align:left;" | 2007–08
| style="text-align:left;" | Aris
| 9 || 2 || 22.6 || .412 || .400 || .789 || 2.8 || 3.1 || 1.3 || .3 || 10.2 || 11.8
|-
| style="text-align:left;" | 2010-11
| style="text-align:left;" | Roma
| 16 || 13 || 26.5 || .507 || .300 || .849 || 3.0 || 1.9 || 1.1 || .0 || 13.0 || 12.3
|- class="sortbottom"
| style="text-align:center;" colspan="2"| Career
| 25 || 15 || 25.1 || .477 || .333 || .824 || 2.9 || 2.4 || 1.2 || .1 || 12.0 || 12.0

NBA
Washington signed with the San Antonio Spurs on October 1, 2007, and was assigned to the Austin Toros of the NBA D-League in late November. He was called up in early December to take Tony Parker's spot on the roster while he healed from an injury; however, Washington was waived by the Spurs on December 28. He appeared in 18 games for the Spurs where he averaged 2.9 points and 1.1 rebounds in 8.1 minutes.

He played with the Chicago Bulls during the 2008–09 NBA pre-season, but was waived by the team before the start of the regular season.

Macedonian national team
Washington was granted Macedonian citizenship , and he joined the Macedonian national basketball team.

In popular culture
The song "The Line" by Phish was written about the missed free throws at the conclusion of the 2005 C-USA Championship game. The song premiered in Atlantic City, New Jersey on October 31, 2013. However, during the performance, Phish guitarist Trey Anastasio mistakenly referred to Washington as having played for Michigan State, and the missed free throws as having taken place during the Final Four.

References

External links
 Darius Washington at draftexpress.com
 Darius Washington at eurobasket2009.org
 Darius Washington at eurobasket.com 
 Darius Washington at euroleague.net
 Darius Washington at nba.com
 Darius Washington at nba.com (D-League)
 Darius Washington at tblstat.net

1985 births
Living people
American expatriate basketball people in China
American expatriate basketball people in the Czech Republic
American expatriate basketball people in France
American expatriate basketball people in Greece
American expatriate basketball people in Israel
American expatriate basketball people in Italy
American expatriate basketball people in North Macedonia
American expatriate basketball people in Russia
American expatriate basketball people in Turkey
American men's basketball players
Aris B.C. players
Austin Toros players
Basketball players from Florida
Basketball Nymburk players
Edgewater High School alumni
Eskişehir Basket players
Galatasaray S.K. (men's basketball) players
Greek Basket League players
Hapoel Eilat basketball players
Iraklis Thessaloniki B.C. players
KK Rabotnički players
Le Mans Sarthe Basket players
Macedonian men's basketball players
McDonald's High School All-Americans
Memphis Tigers men's basketball players
Pallacanestro Virtus Roma players
P.A.O.K. BC players
Parade High School All-Americans (boys' basketball)
PBC Ural Great players
Piratas de Quebradillas players
Point guards
Sakarya BB players
San Antonio Spurs players
Shooting guards
Sportspeople from Winter Park, Florida
Türk Telekom B.K. players
Undrafted National Basketball Association players